is a railway station in Higashi-ku, Nagoya, Aichi Prefecture, Japan

Lines

 (Station number: M14)
Nagoya Guideway Bus
Yutorīto Line (Station number: Y03)

Layout

Nagoya Municipal Subway

Platforms

Nagoya Guideway Bus

Platforms

Adjacent stations

!colspan=5|Nagoya Guideway Bus

References

External links
 

Railway stations in Japan opened in 2000
Railway stations in Japan opened in 2001
Railway stations in Aichi Prefecture